Provincial Road 205 (PR 205) is a provincial road in the Canadian province of Manitoba.

The road begins at PTH 3 near Sperling. It heads east for 10 miles, then turns south for 3 miles, and then continues due east, through the town of Rosenort.  Shortly after its junction with PTH 75, it crosses the Red River at Aubigny and continues east to PTH 59 at St. Pierre-Jolys.  PR 205 turns concurrently with PR 59 south through St. Pierre-Jolys, then resumes east, heading to PR 216.  It then runs concurrently with PR 216 through the community of Grunthal and then turns east once again, passing through Sarto before ending at PTH 12.

External links
Official Manitoba Highway Map

205